Nabeel Saleh Mubarak is a Bahraini modern pentathlete. He competed at the 1984 Summer Olympics, finishing in 41st place in the individual event.

References

Year of birth missing (living people)
Living people
Bahraini male modern pentathletes
Olympic modern pentathletes of Bahrain
Modern pentathletes at the 1984 Summer Olympics